Ivaniš Berislavić was the Despot of the Kingdom of Serbia (regni Rascie despotus) from 1504 to 1514. He was married to Jelena Jakšić who was the daughter of Stefan Jakšić (d. 1489), of the Jakšić noble family fame.

Background
Ivaniš Berislavić was a member of the House of Berislavić, a Croatian noble family from Slavonia, subordinate to the Kingdom of Hungary.

Life
After the death of despot Jovan Branković (1502), Vladislaus II of Hungary made Ivaniš Berislavić the interim despot of Serbia. With no male successor to the Branković dynasty, the position was given to the Berislavić family which had already been intertwined with the Branković dynasty with the marriage of Ivan's cousin Franjo Berislavić and Barbara Frankopan, who had been the widow of Vuk Branković II. In addition, their estates shared borders, and despot Đorđe Branković, as well as Jovan, had been supporters of Mathias Corvinus like the Berislavićs.

Nevertheless, the decision was apparently not welcomed in Serbia, where the local chroniclers would not mention Ivaniš Berislavić by name, likely because they had expected the privilege to pass to the Serbian House of Jakšić, who were also in the service of the Hungarian king.

The official act of making Ivaniš the despot was confirmed by January 1504 in Buda, when his marriage with Jovan's widow Jelena (née Jakšić) was arranged, and he received the title of despot of Serbia. The marriage itself was postponed until May 1504 because of Jelena's illness.

Ivaniš was made protector of the Eastern Orthodox Church in Hungary, and in  charters he signed as "In God's Grace, the Despot of Serbia".

The defence of the southern border of the Kingdom of Hungary was handled by Berislavić as despot, with the support of Stevan, Marko and Petar Jakšić, Stjepan Bradač, and the armed forces of Belgrade and Šabac.

His son, Stefan, had the title of "Serbian Despot" until his defeat in battle against the Ottomans in 1535.

Berislavić received the former appanage of Jovan, which the Hungarians had confiscated upon his death. His residence was at Kupinik, in Srem.

Berislavić was also named the "Ban of Jajce" in 1511, replacing Baltazar Alapić.

He took an oath to secure the southern borders of Hungary and to be loyal to his people. He also had a seat at Brod on the Sava, from where he watched his cities in Srem and Slavonia, including Jajce Banovina.

Because his duties involved a significant effort as well as financial cost, he repeatedly asked the Hungarian King to remove him from service as Ban of Jajce in 1513, and the King complied on 25 May. This was the last mention of him alive, and he is assumed to have died in 1514, because his wife despot Jelena is mentioned as the Lord of the Despot's military forces.

References

Sources

Božanić, S. 2007, "Srem in the period between 1502 and 1526", Spomenica Istorijskog arhiva Srem, no. 6, pp. 72–88.
Aleksa Ivić: Istorija Srba u Vojvodini. Novi Sad 1929.
Mitrović, K. 2008, "Povelja despotice Jelene Jakšić manastiru Hilandaru", Stari srpski arhiv, no. 7, pp. 195–203.
Rastko e-library, Istorija Srba
Crkva Sretenjska

16th-century Serbian monarchs
16th-century Serbian nobility
Despots of Serbia
15th-century births
1514 deaths
Bans (title)
Medieval Croatian nobility
16th century in Bosnia and Herzegovina